KSKG (99.9 FM, "99KG") is a radio station broadcasting a country music format. Licensed to Salina, Kansas, United States, the station serves the Salina-Manhattan area. The station is currently owned by Eagle Communications, Inc.

The first FM station in the Salina market, KSKG went on the air in 1961 using the call letters KAFM (Keeping Alive Fine Music). The original owner was Wayne Pollard dba Salina F-M, Inc. Pollard built the first studios on the top floor of the United Building in downtown Salina and would broadcast a full service format with 3.6 KW of power.  The station became KSKG in 1970 and switched to a Top 40 format. During this time, the station adopted the nickname "99KG".

In 1996, the station switched to a country format and was re-branded "Eagle Country 99.9". The first song that was played when the format was flipped from Top 40 to country was "Sweet Country Music" by Atlanta. The "99KG" moniker was brought back in 2008. KSKG's sister station in Salina is KINA. KSKG is an affiliate of the Kansas City Chiefs radio network and the Bobby Bones Show.

Air Personalities (Past and Present)
 Bart Starr
 The Beaver
 Bill Ray
 Bill Weaver
 Brad King
 Cabana Boy
 Casey Garrett
 Cody Matthews
 Danielle Marshall
 Dave Bradley
 Dave "The Doctor of Music" Lourie
 Devin Hanney
 Denny Collier
 Greg Martin also went by "Murphy"
 Hal Headley
 Jack Armstrong
 Jack Daniels
 Jay "The Jammer" Jeffries
 Jeff Travis
 Katie Conn, the future Miss Kansas
 Leigh Ann Adam
 Lisa Fox
 Mark Alexander
 Mark Davis
 Mark "In The Dark" McKay
 Mark Spencer
 Nervous Nate
 Nikki Nicole
 Radio Meaghan
 "Radio Ray" Pollard
 Randy McKay
 Rick Raynes
 Rocky Romance
 Rusty Keys
 Scotty Woodson
 Shane McClintock
 Shane Sellers
 Stephen Edwards
 Steve Davis
 Steve Wall
 Steve Stanley
 Tennessean Ian
 The Worm
 Travis Dodge
 Shawna Marie

References

External links
 
 

Country radio stations in the United States
SKG
Radio stations established in 1987